1541 Estonia, provisional designation , is an asteroid from the central regions of the asteroid belt, approximately 21 kilometers in diameter. It was discovered on 12 February 1939, by astronomer Yrjö Väisälä at the Iso-Heikkilä Observatory near Turku, Finland. The asteroid was named after the Baltic country of Estonia.

Orbit and classification 

Estonia is a non-family asteroid from the main belt's background population. It orbits the Sun in the central main belt at a distance of 2.6–3.0 AU once every 4 years and 7 months (1,683 days). Its orbit has an eccentricity of 0.07 and an inclination of 5° with respect to the ecliptic.

Physical characteristics 

In the SMASS classification, Estonia is a Xc-subtype that transitions from the X-type to the carbonaceous C-type asteroids.

Rotation period 

In November 2015, a rotational lightcurve of Estonia was obtained from photometric observations by French amateur astronomer René Roy. Lightcurve analysis gave a rotation period of 10.1 hours with a brightness amplitude of 0.13 magnitude.

Diameter and albedo 

According to the surveys carried out by the Japanese Akari satellite and the NEOWISE mission of NASA's Wide-field Infrared Survey Explorer, Estonia measures between 19.53 and 24.542 kilometers in diameter and its surface has an albedo between 0.0976 and 0.140.

The Collaborative Asteroid Lightcurve Link derives an albedo of 0.1314 and a diameter of 20.15 kilometers based on an absolute magnitude of 11.3.

Naming 

This minor planet was named after the Baltic country of Estonia, just south of the Gulf of Finland and Finland itself. The two countries are inhabited by related Balto-Finnic peoples. Estonia gained independence from Soviet rule in 1991. The official  was published by the Minor Planet Center in January 1956.

References

External links 
 Asteroid Lightcurve Database (LCDB), query form (info )
 Dictionary of Minor Planet Names, Google books
 Asteroids and comets rotation curves, CdR – Observatoire de Genève, Raoul Behrend
 Discovery Circumstances: Numbered Minor Planets (1)-(5000) – Minor Planet Center
 
 

001541
Discoveries by Yrjö Väisälä
Named minor planets
001541
19390212